Panga or panga seabream is the common South African name for Pterogymnus laniarius, a small, ocean-dwelling fish, native to the southeast Atlantic Ocean and southwest Indian Ocean. Alternatively called "torpedo scads", they are cold-blooded with white flesh.  Their scales are generally pink in color with whitish underbelly and blue-green stripes running laterally along their sides.

Over the course of its life, a panga will undergo periodic sex-changes with as much as 30% of the population being hermaphroditic at a time.  Despite the presence of both sex organs, it is thought unlikely that both are simultaneously active. Panga are slow to reach sexual maturity, with a minimum population doubling time of 4.5–14 years.

In other countries, the name panga may refer to a different species.  In Indonesia, it refers to Megalaspis cordyla, in Spain, France, the Netherlands and Poland it refers to Pangasius hypophthalmus, and in Kenya it refers to Trichiurus lepturus.

References

External links
 FAO's Species Fact Sheet about Megalaspis cordyla

Sparidae
Fish of the Atlantic Ocean
Fish of the Indian Ocean
Taxa named by Achille Valenciennes
Fish described in 1830